Henry James Bruce CMG MVO 
(1 November 1880 – 10 September 1951) was a British diplomat and author. Nearing the end of a diplomatic career in the Austrian, German and Russian Empires, he married the ballerina Tamara Karsavina. In the 1930s, he was an adviser to the National Bank of Hungary, and in retirement wrote books about his life.

Early life

A younger son of Sir Hervey Juckes Lloyd Bruce, 4th Baronet (1843–1919), by his marriage to Ellen Maud Ricardo OBE, Bruce was one of four sons. His father, who was an officer of the Coldstream Guards, had country houses at Clifton Hall, near Nottingham, and Downhill, County Londonderry, and owned altogether some 22,000 acres. Like his father and brothers, Bruce was educated at Eton.

Bruce's parents lived mainly in London and at Downhill until in 1896 his father succeeded a cousin, Henry Robert Clifton, to the Clifton estates in Nottinghamshire. Bruce's youth at Clifton is recalled in his book Silken Dalliance (1946).

Career

In 1904 Bruce entered the Foreign Office, and in 1905 was sent to Vienna as a junior diplomat in the British mission to the Austrian Empire. In 1906 he was appointed Third Secretary there. In 1908 he transferred to the British Embassy in Berlin, where he was promoted a Second Secretary in May 1911. In 1913 he went to Saint Petersburg, soon to be renamed Petrograd, where he became First Secretary in 1918.

In 1918, Bruce married the Russian prima ballerina Tamara Karsavina (1885–1978).

Bruce retired from the British diplomatic service in 1920 and the next year became Secretary General of the British delegation to the Interallied Commission for Bulgaria, going on to serve as British Delegate from 1924 to 1926. He was an adviser to the National Bank of Hungary from 1931 to 1939, when with the outbreak of the Second World War he returned to the United Kingdom.

In retirement, Bruce began to write books. One reviewer wrote of his Silken Dalliance (1946) "It is more than silken dalliance that "in the wardrobe lies" ; a whole era of English history had the door shut on it in 1914, and nothing quite like it will ever be seen again. It is this era that Mr Bruce set out to capture for us."

In 1949 Bruce became treasurer of the Peabody Donation Fund. He was a member of the St James's Club and the Marylebone Cricket Club. He died on 10 September 1951.

Family
Bruce and Tamara Karsavina's only child was a son, Nikita, born in 1916, who lived until 2002. He married firstly Kay Bannerman, an actress, and secondly Dorothy Mary Norah Mostyn, with whom he had a daughter, Caroline Mary Tamara Bruce (born 1958), and a son, Nicholas William Henry Bruce (born 1960).

Publications
Silken Dalliance (Constable, 1946; second edition 1947)
Thirty Dozen Moons (1949)

Honours
Member of the Royal Victorian Order, 1907
Companion of the Order of St Michael and St George, 1917

External links

Photo of Henry Bruce

Notes

1880 births
1951 deaths
English writers
People educated at Eton College
Companions of the Order of St Michael and St George
Members of the Royal Victorian Order
English male writers